Besim Šerbečić (born 1 May 1998) is a Bosnian professional footballer who plays as a centre-back for Eliteserien club Aalesund and the Bosnia and Herzegovina national team.

Šerbečić started his professional career at Zvijezda Gradačac, before joining Radnik Bijeljina in 2016. Two years later, he was transferred to Rosenborg, who loaned him to Sarajevo in 2019. In 2022, he switched to Aalesund.

A former youth international for Bosnia and Herzegovina, Šerbečić made his senior international debut in 2022.

Club career

Early career
Šerbečić started playing football at his hometown club Bratstvo Gračanica, before joining Zvijezda Gradačac's youth setup. He made his professional debut against Olimpic on 4 April 2015 at the age of 16. On 18 April, he scored his first professional goal against Zrinjski Mostar.

In July 2016, he moved to Radnik Bijeljina.

In January 2018, Šerbečić was transferred to Norwegian outfit Rosenborg.

In July 2019, he was sent on a season-long loan to Sarajevo. In June 2020, his loan was extended for an additional season.

In December 2021, he signed with Aalesund.

International career
Šerbečić represented Bosnia and Herzegovina at all youth levels.

In January 2018, he received his first senior call-up, for friendly games against the United States and Mexico, but had to wait until 26 September 2022 to make his debut in a 2022–23 UEFA Nations League game against Romania.

Career statistics

Club

International

Honours
Rosenborg
Eliteserien: 2018
Norwegian Cup: 2018
Mesterfinalen: 2018

Sarajevo
Bosnian Premier League: 2019–20

References

External links

1998 births
Living people
People from Gračanica, Bosnia and Herzegovina
Bosniaks of Bosnia and Herzegovina
Bosnia and Herzegovina Muslims
Bosnia and Herzegovina footballers
Bosnia and Herzegovina youth international footballers
Bosnia and Herzegovina under-21 international footballers
Bosnia and Herzegovina international footballers
Bosnia and Herzegovina expatriate footballers
Association football central defenders
NK Zvijezda Gradačac players
FK Radnik Bijeljina players
Rosenborg BK players
FK Sarajevo players
Aalesunds FK players
Premier League of Bosnia and Herzegovina players
First League of the Federation of Bosnia and Herzegovina players
Eliteserien players
Expatriate footballers in Norway
Bosnia and Herzegovina expatriate sportspeople in Norway